Lee Seon-woo, known as Infiltration, is a professional esports player from Seoul, South Korea, specializing in fighting games. Lee is a six-time Evolution Championship Series (EVO) champion; winning Super Street Fighter IV Arcade Edition v2012 in 2012, Street Fighter X Tekken in 2012 and 2013, Street Fighter V in 2016 and 2018 (EVO Japan)  and Samurai Shodown in 2019.

Lee was fired from his team, Panda Global, in November 2018 after the organization learned of a domestic abuse case he was convicted for the year before.

Gaming career
Infiltration first started playing fighting games seriously with the home release of Street Fighter IV, but he offered tips for players hoping to raise their skill level. The "Infiltration" name comes from the Metal Gear Solid series, of which he is a big fan. Lee uses a bat-top joystick due to the first FightStick he bought was coincidentally a bat-top joystick sold for 2,000 yen ($20 US). Lee chose Akuma in Street Fighter IV because he heard that Akuma was strong in the game at the time. Lee's main focus is physical training instead of in-game practice.

Lee is the winner of the Street Fighter 25th Anniversary Grand Finals for both Super Street Fighter IV: Arcade Edition v2012 and Street Fighter X Tekken and won $25,000 for each game. The former event saw Lee win against Mad Catz's Daigo Umehara 6–0. Because he won the latter, Lee also received a one of a kind Street Fighter-based Scion FR-S Coupe. Lee also won the Capcom Cup 2013 Street Fighter X Tekken tournament in which he was invited to by Capcom. In March, Lee qualified for the Capcom Pro Tour Asia Finals by winning Nine States Tournament 2015. In late May, Lee qualified for Capcom Cup 2015 by placing Top 3 at Stunfest 2015. Lee's opponents in Top 3, Momochi and Umehara have already qualified thus giving Lee the qualifying spot by default.

Lee is known for having a defensive playstyle as determined by Justin Wong's Step Up Your Game series. On January 16, 2015, Eventhubs ranked Lee at #6 on their Top 50 Ultra Street Fighter IV players list. Lee is also known for creating an outstanding comeback against Eduardo "PR Balrog" Perez in the Losers Semis at EVO 2013 Super Street Fighter IV: Arcade Edition v2012, where he counterpicked Perez's Balrog with Hakan. Lee qualified for the 2014 Capcom Cup by winning CEO 2014 in an exciting battle against Evil Geniuses' Yusuke Momochi. Momochi would later defeat Lee at Capcom Cup 2014 resulting in the latter to get a 4th-place finish.

Because of his performances in 2012, Lee has been called "Player of the Year" by many including Capcom. However, in late 2013, Lee saw a small decline where other players managed to catch up to his level. Overall, Lee still manages to perform well in tournaments he enters, usually making Top 4.

A controversy regarding 2015's Capcom Pro Tour circuit came up regarding Lee, with some labeling him as a "gatekeeper" due to visiting multiple CPT events despite already qualifying for Capcom Cup (here 'gatekeeping' means to keep other players from qualifying). Lee stated in an interview that his intention was not to gatekeep, but instead to practice before the Capcom Cup begins in December. Lee also states that Street Fighter V is going in a good direction, as he thinks that making the game offense-oriented will make it faster and better.

On November 15, 2015, Infiltration signed with Team Razer.

On June 4, 2022, Capcom Fighters announced via a tweet that Infiltration (as well as Michael "Theo Lee Ronin" Parks) "will be banned from all Capcom-owned, operated and/or licensed events globally, including Capcom Pro Tour and Street Fighter League, until further notice."

Personal life
In mid-2014, Lee had to sell the one-of-a-kind Scion FR-S Coupe he won because of high maintenance issues. This was also the same car Lee actually had to earn his drivers license for, just so he could drive it.

On October 22, 2017, Lee got into an argument with his then-wife. The police responded to a call and documented evidence of broken household objects. They left after ordering Lee to refrain from further violence. After they left, Lee purportedly resumed his assault on his wife, who had begun recording the altercation, which was later submitted as evidence, and was thrown out during court proceedings. At this point, neighbors called the police again and Lee was arrested and charged with domestic violence. Paramedics took her to a hospital and documented a wrist injury and bruises. A South Korean court ruled against Lee on November 30, 2017. Lee and his wife divorced in December 2017. Panda Global, Lee's sponsoring team, learned about the assault in September 2018 and withdrew Lee from all upcoming tournaments at the time. He was fired from the team on November 22, 2018, after Panda Global obtained his court records.

Notable tournament placings

References and notes

External links
 Infiltration's Player Profile - Shoryuken Rankings
 Infiltration on Facebook
 Infiltration on Twitter
 Infiltration on Twitch

Living people
People from Seoul
South Korean esports players
Fighting game players
Team Razer players
Street Fighter players
Year of birth missing (living people)